"Mustapha" is a song written by Freddie Mercury and recorded by British rock band Queen. It is the first track of their 1978 album Jazz, categorized as "an up-tempo Arabic rocker" by Circus magazine.

Single
"Mustapha" was released as a single in Germany, Spain, Yugoslavia and Bolivia in 1979. The B side of the single was "Dead On Time" for German and Spanish releases and "In Only Seven Days" for Yugoslavian and Bolivian releases. Also, all four versions had different covers.

Lyrics
The composition's lyrics are mainly in English and Arabic, speaking about Allah, the God in Islam, and it also has one sentence in Persian-emulating gibberish since the singer had a Parsi background.
Parts of the lyrics like "Achtar es na sholei" meaning "His star, not his flame" have clear ties to the Persian language.

Live performances
In live performances, Mercury would often sing the opening vocals of "Mustapha" in place of the complex introduction to "Bohemian Rhapsody", going from "Allah we'll pray for you" to "Mama, just killed a man...". However, from the 1979 Saarbrucken Festival to the South American Game Tour, the band performed an almost full version of the song, with Mercury at the piano, where they dropped the second verse and went from the first chorus to the third. He also sang the intro before launching the band into "Hammer to Fall", as seen on We Are the Champions: Final Live in Japan.

Personnel
 Freddie Mercury - lead and backing vocals, piano
 Brian May - electric guitar
 Roger Taylor - drums, hawk bells
 John Deacon - bass guitar

References

External links
 Lyrics at Queen official website

Queen (band) songs
1978 songs
1979 singles
Macaronic songs
Songs written by Freddie Mercury
Song recordings produced by Roy Thomas Baker
EMI Records singles
Hollywood Records singles
British hard rock songs
British progressive rock songs